Jean Valet (5 March 1923 – 4 October 1984) was a Belgian footballer. He played in one match for the Belgium national football team in 1951.

References

External links
 

1923 births
1984 deaths
Belgian footballers
Belgium international footballers
Association football defenders
People from Ixelles
Footballers from Brussels